The Local 77 chapter of the American Federation of State, County and Municipal Employees is a Duke University labor union established in August 1965. It initially began as the Duke Employees Benevolent Society in February 1965, led by Oliver Harvey. The formation of Local 77 was directed towards improving work conditions for the working class employees, most of whom were African-American. Members fought for minimum wage increases, improvements in working conditions, and medical benefits for employees. The union members of Local 77 demanded a systematic way of dealing with workplace complaints that were impartial to the Duke University administration. Because the majority of the union's members were African-American, several of the goals overlapped with the ideas of the Civil Rights Movement.

Historical context 

The first steps towards inclusion of black Durham residents in the work force occurred during World War II, when the federal government reluctantly allowed black workers to fill up open job positions in Durham, left by those who went to fight in the war. What seemed a promising step towards civil rights efforts faded as soldiers returned at the end of the war to reclaim their positions in society. Both black men and women lost their factory jobs at the shutdown of several major wartime plants that were no longer needed post-war. Oliver Harvey, who later led the organizational efforts of Local 77, was affected by the wartime demand for black employees.

Oliver Harvey 

Born in Franklinton, North Carolina, a small textile and tobacco town, Harvey grew up alongside his father who owned his own land, which was very uncommon for black farmers in the 1930s. When his tenants stole from his property, Harvey's father lost his land. Refusing to join the sharecropping business, Harvey looked for work in Durham. In 1936, Harvey found a job at the American Tobacco Company where the segregated unions troubled him. In a journal article about his father, the younger Harvey wrote, “I got my hatred for segregation from my father. He was raised up in the house of a white couple, two liberal lawyers. He learned to always speak up for himself.” In 1943, Harvey worked at the Krueger Bottling Company in Durham where he successfully led efforts to integrate the segregated black and white unions. During the black union protest against the segregated pay scales, forty-four out of the forty-five whites in the plant joined the black union in their strike.
Eight years later, Harvey began work as a nighttime janitor at Duke University where he encountered a discouraging atmosphere for social change. Duke was a segregated school at the time, as all Southern institutions were, and was not integrated until 1963. Even following integration, racial inequality still existed during the Civil Rights Movement. Black workers were to address students by “Mister” and “Miss,” though the reverse was not required of the students. Harvey's confrontation with a student who objected to this rule led to the end of this practice. His insistence for more respect towards university workers suggested that the goals of the labor union extended beyond the need for fair wages, but also for independence, credibility, and authority, matching the goals of the Civil Rights Movement at the time.

Conflicts leading up to unionization 

While Duke University's reputation grew as a national educational institution, its attitudes towards black workers remained unchanged. The same year the Duke Employees Benevolent Society was established in 1965, Duke revealed a new $200 million plan to promote Duke's status as a top national university. The funds were used to advance the renovation of new libraries, science research labs, and more modern facilities. Despite Duke University's reputation as an institution for higher education and its growing expertise in preparing its students for the professional society, the working environments and attitudes towards black, blue-collar workers had not changed. Workers were not given health insurance, received little pay, had inconsistent and demanding schedules, often working ten to twelve days without a day off, and were treated unprofessionally. One nurse's maid, Helen Johnstone, recalled being treated like a servant: “When I was a nurse’s maid, our second head nurse, Joan Ashley, she used to run me everywhere—uptown to get the immunizations and to put them in my refrigerator. She had me run to the library to return her books for her on time.” It was not unusual for black workers to be treated this way, especially as a result of unclear job descriptions that gave those with higher power control over the tasks assigned to black workers.

The administration initially denied the union recognition. While the university discouraged the formation of labor unions, arguing that “it can do more ‘for’ the employee than a union,” Local 77 denounced this idea as “deepening the basic problem,” suggesting that “Employees need to have a voice in their own future; and that voice can only come through collective bargaining...Only then may employees negotiate and sign a contract as mutual, equal participants rather than dependents of a paternal employer with unilateral decision-making power. Only then will the psychology of dependence be overcome.” The black work force had little power in the grievance procedures.

Union conflicts and its societal effects

Hattie Williams, Viola Watson, and the opposition toward labor unions 

The cases of Hattie Williams and Viola Watson highlighted the difficulties of labor organizing on Duke's campus. Initially, unionization efforts had little effect on working conditions because of a historically unwelcoming environment for labor unions, and the resulting lack of recognition by the university's entire population. At first, employees attained only minor improvements in pay, and a new grievance procedure easily manipulated by management and administrators. In the case of Hattie Williams and Viola Watson, members involved with Local 77 and African-American housekeepers who had worked for at least four years, were fired without warning in the winter of 1966. Both workers received no complaints about the quality of their work. However, both previously involved themselves in the Local 77 movement; Williams was a Union Steward and Watson had picketed for higher wages with the union. They used the grievance procedure to reclaim their positions in the university. However, only Hattie Williams was returned to her job while Watson was denied permission to her previous position.
The Local 77 Statement of Policy pointed out the inconsistency of the present Duke policies ruling out previous segregationist practices, as discrimination still existed, and believed it was too easy “for lower Management to work in clear violation of the University’s avowed policy.”  The last step of the grievance procedure, a meeting between three members of the Personnel Policy Committee closely tied to the university, claimed to be “perfectly objective in rendering a final decision” for the Williams and Watson case. However, in his letter to university president Douglas Knight, Harvey proposed that “if Duke truly wishes to be fair in its dealings with employees, a disinterested third party should constitute the final appeal on grievances.”   The primary goal of Local 77 was to gain impartial arbitration as a way to settle disputes objectively, allowing the participation of a third party to discern final judgments.

Shirley Ramsey: garnering student and faculty support 

Despite initial failures and the slow progress of Local 77's new campaign, Local 77 gained momentum as they received more support from students and faculty. In the spring of 1966, Shirley Ramsey, one of the first black food service workers to be promoted to cashier, was requested by a supervisor to perform pie-cutting duties in the dining hall, a task outside the range of her job description. When Ramsey refused the supervisor's request, she was fired from her job. Consequently, Ramsey filed a claim through the grievance procedure, believing that race was a determining factor for the reason that she was singled out by her employer to perform a task outside of her job description.
In the midst of the Civil Rights Movement, the issue of race as a factor in Ramsey's case attracted the support of students and faculty, along with media coverage. The union submitted a letter to the editor for The Chronicle, explaining details surrounding the controversy of Ramsey's firing. Many Duke students who were also involved in the work setting as part-time workers wore buttons to show their support. Despite the overwhelming support, the judges of Ramsey's case rejected her complaint at the last stage and denied the association of race with her firing, stating that “successful operation of the dining halls depended upon the willingness of the employees to respond to rapidly changing situations caused by the very nature of the business.”  Cleverly avoiding the matter from the standpoint of race relations, the administration solely regarded the relocation of Ramsey as a matter of employee compliance to their supervisors. Nevertheless, the collective effort of the entire Duke community behind Ramsey's case encouraged workers to continue challenging the work conditions based on race.

Iola Woods: union representation in grievance procedures 

Motivated by the widespread community support, Local 77 continued to fight against an apathetic and blatantly racist administration. In response to a faculty supporter's letter urging him to comply with the black workers' demands, university president Douglas Knight denied any support stating, "It is far more important both for the University and the region to make certain that salaries continue to rise for more skilled people than those who receive minimum compensation" and continues to propose an offensive solution to the problem by "eliminating employees who can work only at a minimum level of effectiveness." Knight responded as if their low-class jobs were a privilege, implying the incompetency of black workers for minimum wage working conditions.

Not soon afterwards, the university hired the Alexander Proudfoot Corporation, an efficiency firm, whose goal was to reduce university operating costs especially in the service and clerical sectors, including the jobs held by black workers. When workloads increased by an average of 81 percent, complaints from workers resulted. Among those complaints was Iola Woods, a dormitory maid who was assigned to clean 12 rooms, empty the trash of 24 rooms, and clean two dorm bathrooms in one hour and twenty minutes. This led 42 maids to file grievances with the administration for modifications in their workload. In support of the maids’ protests, student and faculty supporters established a committee, the Students, Faculty, and Friends of Local 77 (SFFL), which assisted the labor union in its fight for fair work conditions. During an investigation of work conditions, three students unsuccessfully tried to complete the work assigned to maids. Furthermore, the SFFL examined the maids’ work schedules for inconsistencies, and found that they had significantly more tasks at different times of the day. The SFFL continued to raise awareness for the need of impartial arbitration. When the administration offered no response to the SFFL proposals for impartial arbitration, union members began picketing in spring of 1967 outside the administrative building and Duke Medical Center. After a week of protests, the university finally agreed to negotiations with Local 77 in establishing a new grievance panel that included the participation of a third party. The union had the ability to choose one out of the three members on the panel. While this process was still biased towards administration, this was the first step towards future improvement.

Silent Vigil and worker demands 

After the assassination of Martin Luther King Jr. in 1968, the Duke community gathered together during the Silent Vigil to raise awareness for racial equality on campus, presenting an opportunity for Local 77 to accentuate both their workplace and racial equality concerns. Duke students, faculty, and administration immersed in social equality reflections and negotiations over university policies protecting these rights. Local 77's participation in the Silent Vigil contributed to the issue of race relations as a whole. As Rees Shearer eloquently described the role of Local 77's presence at the Vigil, “In reflection, I think we needed Local #77 more than they needed us. We needed a way to express regret, to dissociate ourselves from the assassination and to try to do something right about the dominant issue of our nation: race.”  This had been an issue long avoided by the Duke community and the divided nation.

Motivated by the struggle for social equality, more than a thousand students and faculty demonstrated on the campus quad, boycotting the dining halls. Workers picketed for a $1.60 minimum wage, collective bargaining rights, and an impartial grievance procedure. After a strike that lasted for thirteen days, attracting national media attention, the administration complied with requests to raise the minimum wage. However, the administration continued to refuse collective bargaining rights. Instead, they implemented the Duke University Employees Advisory Committee, a faculty committee that negotiated with nonacademic workers. This included the participation of “twelve technical and clerical worker representatives along with twelve service and maintenance worker representatives.”

Recognition by the University 
In fall of 1970, the National Labor Relations Board (NLRB) gave workers the right to form unions in private universities. However, the NLRB ruling only granted collective bargaining rights to non-hospital workers. At the time, Local 77 was composed of both hospital and campus service workers, and hospital workers strongly supported Local 77. Several hospital workers in Local 77 held manual tasks that did not involve patient care, and in the end, the ruling permitted these workers for union representation. By 1971, Duke voluntarily agreed to the unionization of both housekeeping and laundry workers in the medical center and campus workers. Harvey perceived this as Duke's strategy for preventing future unionizing pressure from other food and service workers in the medical center. After the long enduring fight for fair working conditions, Local 77 finally received union recognition in January, 1972.

Following the Civil Rights Movement, most students held liberal views on social equality issues. However, student support decreased by a change in the general student body's “embrace of a liberal individualist theology.”  This followed the idea that the younger generation found more meaning in one-to-one environments rather than working through a matter systematically and questioning institutional policies. This was seemingly demonstrated when the university discussed the privatization of dining services in 1998. The introduction of fast-food chains on campus oftentimes refused hiring employees affiliated with labor unions, reducing the demand for unionized labor that Local 77 represented. More than 80 percent of the student body favored the administration's proposal, despite the fact that the primarily black work force would be earning less than Durham's living wage.

While the Local 77 movement in the 1960s succeeded in extending racial equality towards the predominantly black labor unions, the lack of student support in the following years hindered further improvements for a demographic group with much less power than Duke's administration.  Nowhere was this more apparent than in the unsuccessful unionization drives at Duke University's hospital.

Although public support had decreased, Local 77 built a strong foundation for itself in its campaign during the 1960s. The labor union reached its goals of attaining higher pay, fair treatment in the workplace, and showing that they were “a force within the very institution that had marginalized them.”

References 

Duke University
American Federation of State, County and Municipal Employees
Trade unions established in 1965